Lebanese Rally Championship is the national rally championship of Lebanon.

Champions

References

External links

Rally racing series
Sport in Lebanon